Tunker is an unincorporated community in Washington Township, Whitley County, in the U.S. state of Indiana.

History
Tunker was founded in 1839, and was named after the Tunker family of settlers. A post office was established at Tunker in 1886, and remained in operation until it was discontinued in 1904.

Geography

References

Unincorporated communities in Whitley County, Indiana
Unincorporated communities in Indiana
Fort Wayne, IN Metropolitan Statistical Area